Sze Wan Natural Yip (born 4 May 1985) is a Hong Kong women's cricketer who is also a current member of the Hong Kong cricket team. 

Natural Yip made her international debut at the 2012 Women's Twenty20 Asia Cup. She too was part of the national team in the 2010 Asian Games and 2014 Asian Games.

References

External links 
 
Profile at CricHQ

1985 births
Living people
Hong Kong women cricketers
Cricketers at the 2010 Asian Games
Cricketers at the 2014 Asian Games
Asian Games competitors for Hong Kong